The Busters are a German third wave ska revival band, established as a side project in 1987. Playing 2 Tone-influenced ska, they became one of the best-known German ska bands, having a minor hit single in Germany with a ska cover of Bobby McFerrin's "Don't Worry Be Happy" They signed to Sony Music in Germany in 1996, and released the album Stompede and the best of compilation Boost Best. They continue to tour Germany every Christmas and run their own independent record label, Ska Revolution Records. The Busters have recently released their thirteenth studio album Waking The Dead.

The song "Dr. Phibes" from the album "Revolution Rock" (2004) is inspired by the film The Abominable Dr. Phibes (1971). It is an instrumental with the organ as the main instrument, including a long organ solo.

They are the second group to use this name, the first being an American instrumental group who had the 
1963 release "Bust Out" on Arlen records.

Albums
 Ruder Than Rude (1988)
 Couch Potatoes (1989)
 Dead or Alive (1991)
 Cheap Thrills (1992)
 Sexy Money (1994)
 Live in Montreux (1995)
 Stompede (1996)
 Boost Best (1997)
 Make a Move (1998)
 Welcome to Busterland (1999)
 360° (2001)
 Live (2002)
 Revolution Rock (2004)
 Evolution Pop (2005)
 Double Penetration (2007)
 Waking The Dead (2009)
 Supersonic Eskalator (2014)
 Ska Bang 87 (2016)
 Straight Ahead (2017)
 The Busters (2019)
 Love Bombs (2022)

Singles
  No Respect  (1988)
  Don't Worry Be Happy  (1989)
  Rude Girl  (1989)
  She Was My Girl  (with Laurel Aitken/1989)
  Summertime  (1989)
  94er Hits  (1994)
  Ubangi Stomp  (1996)
  Behind Your Door  (1996)
  Ska Muzik  (1997)
  Candy  (1997)
  Come On  (1998)
  Liebe macht blind  (with Farin Urlaub/2000)
  Wir lassen es nicht zu  (2001)
  Sukiyaki vs Tokyo Ska Zone  (2005)
  Radio Smash Hit  (2005) (online release only)
  Whiskey 'til I Drop  (2005) (online release only)
  Clocks Don't Rock  (2006) (online release only)
  The Wrong Song   (2007) (online release only)
  Live It Up  (2009) (online release only)

References

External links
 

German musical groups
Third-wave ska groups